The F.W. Clarke Medal is an annual award presented by the Geochemical Society to an early-career scientist for a single outstanding contribution to geochemistry or cosmochemistry, published either as a single paper or a series of papers on a single topic. The award is named after Frank Wigglesworth Clarke, one of the founding fathers of geochemistry. F.W. Clarke medal have in the past been disproportionately given to white men, though this is changing.

List of recipients
 Source: Geochemical Society

 1972 Dimitri A. Papanastassiou
 1973 Hiroshi Ohmoto
 1974 Lawrence Grossman
 1975 David Walker
 1976 James R. Wood
 1977 Bjorn O. Mysen
 1978 Donald J. DePaolo
 1979 Antonio C. Lasaga
 1980 R.W. Potter, II
 1981 Jean-Francois Minster
 1982 P. Jonathan Patchett
 1983 E. Bruce Watson
 1984 Andrew S. MacKenzie
 1985 Edward M. Stolper
 1986 Mark D. Kurz
 1987 Eiichi Takahashi
 1988 Fred M. Phillips
 1989 No Award Given
 1990 Richard J. Walker
 1991 David M. Sherman
 1992 Emily Klein
 1993 Youxue Zhang
 1994 Carl B. Agee
 1995 Rebecca A. Lange
 1996 Patricia M. Dove
 1997 Jonathan Blundy
 1998 Munir Humayun
 1999 Andre Scheidegger
 2000 James Farquhar
 2001 Craig C. Lundstrom
 2002 Ruth E. Blake
 2003 Paul D. Asimow
 2004 Andrea Grottoli
 2005 James A. van Orman
 2006 Alexis S. Templeton
 2007 Ethan F. Baxter
 2008 Andrew D. Jacobson
 2009 Cin-Ty Lee
 2010 Thorsten Kleine
 2011 Rajdeep Dasgupta
 2012 David T. Johnston
 2013 Blair Schoene
 2014 Matthew G. Jackson
 2015 Anat Shahar
 2016 Laurence Yeung
 2017 Francis McCubbin
 2018 Noah Planavsky
 2019 Thomas Kruijer 	  	 
 2020 Daniel Stolper

See also

 List of chemistry awards
 List of earth sciences awards
 List of geology awards
 Prizes named after people

References

External links
 

American science and technology awards
Earth sciences awards
Awards established in 1972
Early career awards
Geochemical Society